This is a list of the main career statistics of Swiss tennis player Patty Schnyder.

Performance timelines

Only main-draw results in WTA Tour, Grand Slam tournaments, Fed Cup and Olympic Games are included in win–loss records.

Singles

Doubles

WTA career finals

Singles: 27 (11 titles, 16 runner-ups)

Doubles: 16 (5 titles, 11 runner-ups)

ITF Circuit finals

Singles: 14 (7 titles, 7 runner-ups)

Top 10 wins

Head-to-head vs. top 10 ranked players

Notes

References 

Schnyder, Patty